Eureka! is a computer-animated television series created by Norton Virgien and Niamh Sharkey that premiered on Disney Junior on June 22, 2022.

Plot 
In the Stone Age location of Rocky Falls, a prehistoric girl named Eureka enjoys going on adventures and building gadgets to help improve the lifestyles of her family and friends.

Characters

Main 
 Eureka (voiced by Ruth Righi) — A liberal and open-minded prehistoric girl who is also an inventor way ahead of her time. She was credited as being responsible for inventing the wheel. To make an invention, Eureka would do something called "Thinkering" (a combination of the words thinking and tinkering).
 Roxy (voiced by Renée Elise Goldsberry) — Eureka's mother who is the proprietor and chef of Paleo, Rocky Falls' only restaurant.
 Rollo (voiced by Lil Rel Howery) — Eureka's father who owns the pottery shop and is an expert potter.
 Ohm (voiced by Javier Muñoz) — Eureka's teacher who has an outdoor classroom.
 Pepper (voiced by Kai Zen) — One of Eureka's best friends. She's courageous and has super-strength.
 Barry (voiced by Devin Trey Campbell) — One of Eureka's best friends. He's an artist and a drummer.
 Murphy (vocal effects provided by Fred Tatasciore) — Eureka's pet woolly mammoth. Eureka adopted Murphy after saving him from being trapped under a fallen tree branch.
 Dipply (vocal effects provided by Fred Tatasciore) — Pepper's pet diplosaurus.

Recurring 
 Bog (voiced by Cade Tropeano) — A conservative boy and Eureka's classmate who likes being the leader.
 Ump (vocal effects provided by Fred Tatasciore) — Bog's pet Glyptosaurus which evokes the traits of a Glyptodon and an armadillo.
 Clod (voiced by Connor Andrade) — A turtle-loving boy and Eureka's classmate who is very loyal to Bog.
 Julia (voiced by Madigan Kacmar) — A girl who is one of Eureka's classmates and an expert at playing the flute.
 Ember (voiced by Sasha Knight) — A girl with blonde and blue hair who is one of Eureka's classmates.
 Sierra (voiced by Ryan Michelle Bathé) — Barry's mother who is Rocky Falls' residential dentist.
 Sandy (voiced by Wendell Pierce) — Barry's father who is Rocky Falls' residential handyman.
 Dima (voiced by Kevin Michael Richardson) — Barry's grandfather.
 Verna (voiced by Cree Summer) — Barry's grandmother.
 Wanda (voiced by Loretta Devine) — Eureka's paternal grandmother who is a traveler.
 Yonder (vocal effects provided by Fred Tatasciore) — A ground sloth who is Wanda's pet and travel companion.
 Yurt (voiced by Sheila E.) — A celebrity drummer whom Barry looks up to.
 Rockanne (voiced by Misty Copeland) — A dance instructor.
 Chee (voiced by Ellie Kemper) — The school librarian.
 Kanga Bird a.k.a. KB (voiced by Jack McBrayer) — A dinosaur that evokes the traits of a Kangadon and a bird. Unlike other prehistoric animals in this show, KB is able to speak a few words. He becomes Barry's pet in "Be My KB".
 Archi (voiced by Ian Ho) — 
 Spruce and Cypress Stoneland (both voiced by Judah Howery) — Twin brothers.
 Olive and Ivy (voiced by Aydrea Walden and Cree Summer) — Pepper's mothers.
 Ferreka (vocal effects provided by Jan Johns) — The leader of a pack of mischievous bronto-ferrets. Her creativity which rivals that of Eureka earned her the name "Ferreka" which is a portmanteau of ferret and Eureka.

Episodes

Notes

References

External links 
 
 

2020s American animated television series
2020s American black cartoons
2020s American children's television series
2020s preschool education television series
2022 American television series debuts
American children's animated television series
American computer-animated television series
American preschool education television series
Animated preschool education television series
Animated television series about children
Disney Junior original programming
Disney animated television series
English-language television shows
Television series by Brown Bag Films
Television series by Disney